The Minister of the Air Force of Italy, was the minister responsible for the Ministry of the Air Force. The position was created during the Mussolini Cabinet and was abolished with the creation of the position for Minister of Defence.

List of Ministers

Kingdom of Italy
Parties:

Coalitions:

Other:

Republic of Italy

Parties:

Coalitions:

See also
 Minister of War
 Minister of the Navy

References

Air Force